This is a list of the National Register of Historic Places listings in Devils Tower National Monument.

This is intended to be a complete list of the properties and districts on the National Register of Historic Places in Devils Tower National Monument, Wyoming, United States.  The locations of National Register properties and districts for which the latitude and longitude coordinates are included below, may be seen in a Google map.

There are four properties and districts listed on the National Register in the park.

Current listings 

|--
|}

See also 
 National Register of Historic Places listings in Crook County, Wyoming
 National Register of Historic Places listings in Wyoming

References 
McKoy, Kathy. National Register of Historic Places Multiple Property Documentation Form: Devils Tower National Monument Multiple Property Submission. National Park Service 1990-1994